The EP is the first extended play by 3for3. Maxx Recordings released the EP on July 24, 2015. They worked with Bernie Herms, in the production of this EP.

Critical reception

Awarding the EP three stars from Jesus Freak Hideout, Sarah Berdon writes, "Though the lyrics are not the deepest and the music does not necessarily stand out from other pop albums, the messages 3for3 presents here go beyond what is normally found in debuts". Joshua Andre, giving the EP four star at 365 Days of Inspiring Media, states, "With Spencer, Benji and Josh delivering high quality songs and poignant melodies for God, this album is one to be savoured and enjoyed throughout this year and many more to come."

Track listing

References

2015 EPs